Throughout history, the political, social, and economic status of women in Jordan has varied based on the legal, traditional, cultural and religious values at the time. Women's rights and experiences in Jordan also vary based on other factors, such as class, place of origin, religion, and other factors. In 2020, the World Economic Forum's Global Gender Gap Index, which amalgamates data on economic behavior, educational attainment, health and survival, and political empowerment, ranked Jordan 138 out of 153 nations.

Political representation

Operative legal framework
The current operating framework for women's rights in Jordan includes the Jordanian Constitution, a civil status code, the Personal Status Law and international law regarding human rights. Traditional and cultural ideals of femininity also effect how women are viewed and treated in Jordan.  Jordanian women, however, did not receive the right to vote until 1974. This was fairly late for the region, as Israel, Syria, Lebanon, Egypt, Yemen, Turkey and Iran had all granted women suffrage by 1967.

The Jordanian Constitution was written in 1952 and states that all “Jordanians shall be equal before the law. There shall be no discrimination between them as regards their rights and duties on grounds of race, language or religion.”  Many constitutional provisions affirm basic rights and political representation for all.  As a further example, Article 22 states that each Jordanian has equal opportunity to be appointed to and serve in public office, that such appointments “shall be made on the basis of merit and qualifications.”  An amendment in January 2003 implemented the quota system in Jordanian parliament, and while a religious precedent existed for parliamentary seats in the constitution, allocating seats for women was new and showed that the government recognized and wanted to break down barriers women face in running for office. The Provisional Penal Code reduces sentencing for men who commit violent acts against women in the “honor” context (see below: "Gender-Based Violence"). In the last decade, however, the code has been amended. While the original law allowed men to implement the law themselves, the new amendment left punishment and sentencing to the judicial system of the state. There are no provisions under the Labor or Penal Codes to protect women against sexual harassment. Jordan is a member of many international organizations that guarantee basic human rights to women.

Representation in elected office

While female participation in Jordanian parliament has increased over the past decade, it still remains low. Notwithstanding the 1974 law giving women the right to campaign and serve in office, few Jordanian women today are motivated to or feel comfortable running for political office, while even fewer are elected and ultimately serve. In 2016 and 2020, the Sisterhood is Global Initiative in Jordan launched a program called "Eye on Women" to monitor activity of and reception to women's political campaigns. The current King of Jordan, His Majesty King Abdullah II, passed legislation requiring a quota for the number of women in parliament. Since the quota was established, 15 of the 130 seats in the Lower House of Parliament have consistently and successfully been reserved for women. However, women won 19 seats in the 2013 elections. In the 2020 elections, 15 seats were reserved for women and only exactly that number were elected (again out of 130 seats total). Female candidates had constituted 20.5% of the 1,674 individuals running for parliamentary office in 2020; they ultimately won 11.5% of the seats.

Queen Rania of Jordan has used her position and power to support women's rights. Her family is of Palestinian descent (her father was from Ṭūlkarm, her mother from Nablus) and was born and raised in Kuwait. Rania is highly educated; she has a business administration degree from the American University in Cairo (1991) and before marrying King Abdullah II in January 1993, she worked as a banker. As Queen, Rania has championed women's rights, access to education, environmental concerns, and the development of strong Jordanian communities. In March 2008, she launched a video blog as part of her efforts to deconstruct stereotypes about Arabs and promote dialogue with the West.

Jordanian National Commission for Women
The Jordanian National Commission for Women's (JNCW) mission is to “support mainstreaming of a gender-equality perspective in all policy areas and to narrow the gap between formal acknowledgement of women's rights as detailed by legislation and actual societal attitudes towards women through improving the status of women and enhancing their role in national development.”
They work to equalize women's social, political, and economic status in Jordan by proposing legislation and studying the existing policies regarding women's rights. The JNCW also works closely with various public institutions and NGO's in hopes of branching out and developing their organization. In 1996, the Jordanian cabinet made the JNCW the official government “reference point” on all issues pertaining to women; it now reports directly to the prime minister. The JNCW has become a quasi-governmental institution accountable in large part for drafting national policies regarding women's rights and economic advancement. It is led by Secretary General Asma Khader, a prominent feminist lawyer who is also CEO of Jordan's Sisterhood is Global Institute (SIGI).

Social representation

Education

With a female literacy rate of 97.4%, Jordan has the highest female literacy rate in the Middle East. The majority of Jordanian women are both literate and highly educated; differences in career expectations based on gender tend to stem from cultural practices, not the fact that women are not as meritorious as men.

Constitutional provisions affirm all Jordanian citizens’ basic rights to education. Article 20 makes elementary education required for all Jordanians and free of charge in public, government schools. This provision is elaborated on and reinforced in the Education Act. The Jordanian government spends more than 5% on education every year, and since 1980, the literacy rate in Jordan increased from 69.2% to 91% (2002) to 97.4% (2012).

Female enrollment at all levels of school is high and Jordanian women have the highest average number of years of schooling in comparison with women in both Kuwait and Bahrain. While as of 2005 men in Jordan received 1.7 years more schooling than women in Jordan receive, that difference is considered very low for the region. The dropout rate is not excessive. Women who do drop out of schooling claim their primary reason (at various levels) is marriage and their responsibilities in the home, while men who drop out say they do so primarily to get jobs and help their families make money.

Family approval of a woman's education is crucial. When a poorer family is unable to put more than one child through school, the boy will likely get the education and the girl is expected to focus on homemaking skills. While women have access to basic schooling, access to technical training is limited as women are expected to study topics that directly relate to their dominant roles as wives and mothers – such as art, humanities, and teaching (2005).  There is excessive gender stereotyping in Jordanian textbooks.

Employment
There are constitutional provisions that affirm Jordanian citizens’ basic rights to work. Nothing in Islam, the majority religion in Jordan, forbids women from doing so. The Constitution states, "Work is the right of all citizens," "Jobs are based on capability," and "All Jordanians are equal before the law. There will be no discrimination between Jordanians regarding rights and duties based on race, language or religion." The Labor Laws clarify the Constitution further: "By Jordanians are meant both men and women." The Labor Code defines a worker/laborer/employee as “each person, male or female, who performs a job in return for wages.” The Constitution asserts that the government “shall ensure work and education within the limits of its possibilities, and it shall ensure a state of tranquility and equal opportunities to all Jordanians.” Work is “the right of every citizen,” and “the State shall provide opportunities for work to all citizens by directing the national economy and raising its standards.”  Jordanian labor laws protect women from losing their jobs during pregnancy and give them assistance with childcare. While the laws themselves promote justice and equality, the traditional ideals of masculinity and femininity and the "patriarchal nature of the legal system" contribute to women's noticeable absence from the workplace and the inequalities they face once there.

Gender inequalities in Jordan today also stem from traditional gender roles that have embedded themselves in Jordanian culture. “At the root of the barriers to women's labor force participation are traditional attitudes that place a high value on women's roles in the private sphere and within the family that is important in Jordanian society.”  These stereotypes are based on the notions that: “(a) men and women differ biologically and that these biological differences determine their social function; (b) men and women carry different and complementary responsibilities within the family; and (c) they have different but equitable rights associated with those responsibilities.” 

The "traditional paradigm" of Jordanian gender expects women to marry early and contribute to the family as a homemaker, wife and mother. It assumes that the man will be in charge of the household and that he will provide for his family financially. Women, as wives and mothers, are perceived as vulnerable and in need of protection that should be provided by the husband. Men's responsibility to protect their wives and children is considered sufficient justification for their exercise of authority over women in all areas of decision-making regarding both the public and private spheres. Due to this traditional paradigm, women's interaction with and representation in politics and society are mediated by her husband. While this paradigm exists to some extent all over the world, it is particularly prominent in Jordan as it has become institutionalized and pervades the legal framework.

Unemployment, underemployment, differences in wages and occupational segregation are the four main factors in the economy that impact women's level of labor. In terms of unemployment, 15% of men are unemployed while 25% of women are unemployed and 82% of young women ages 15–29 are unemployed.  Women are underemployed as they tend to be hired less than men with lesser education because large sections of the Jordanian economy are and have traditionally been closed off to women. Less educated men often hold more jobs while women are often better educated, leading to many women settling for jobs requiring lesser education than they have. Wage discrimination in Jordan is no different from anywhere else in the world, but in combination with traditional and cultural factors – like being responsible for the private sphere (the family and the home) – women are driven away from the workforce. Jordanian law suggests that wives should be obedient to their husbands because the men financially support the family, and if she is disobedient her husband can discontinue financial support. In addition, men have assumed the power to forbid their wives from working, and the Jordanian courts have upheld these laws. Furthermore, as honor killings consistently occur and are currently on the rise, women are less motivated to leave the safety of their homes. Laws in Jordan regarding honor killings continue to make it possible for courts to deal with perpetrators leniently.

Occupational segregation exists in all aspect of the Jordanian workforce as both vertical and horizontal segregation is present. Vertical segregation refers to the concept of the glass ceiling, where women are concentrated in lower paying, lower-ranking jobs and cannot break through to the higher levels. Horizontal segregation occurs when certain occupations are more female intensive. For example, more Jordanian men are civil servants and fill high-ranking positions while Jordanian women are concentrated in middle-ranking jobs. The consequences of women's limited economic advancement and low female participation in the workforce leads to low utilization of national production capacity (World Bank estimates it is currently at half its potential), lower average household income and lower per capita GDP. The greatest challenge to incorporating women equally into the workplace is overcoming traditional attitudes towards women and their expected duties as mothers and wives. A change in attitude will inevitably lead to the changing of "gendered laws" and the role of women as homemakers.

In July 2021, Jordanian media minister Sakher Dudin called for a collaborative public and private effort to empower women economically, since women in Jordan comprise 15 percent of the overall workforce, according to a report published by the Department of Statistics.

Domestic Migrant Workers in Jordan 
Estimates put one million migrant workers in employment in Jordan (though only about a third are documented) and the vast majority are women who come from the Philippines, Bangladesh, Sri Lanka, and Uganda. These women often send remittances back to their home countries as a source of family income. Many worker under the "Kafala" (Sponsorship) system which is wide use to regulate the relationship between employers and employees, including making employees' legal status in the country fully dependent on employers. The practice of Kafala is critiqued by many, including the International Labor Organization. The International Domestic Workers Federation (est. 2009) works with networks in Jordan to promote decent working conditions, though many migrant women ultimately rely on informal networks for support. According to the Executive Director of Tamkeen for Legal Aid and Human Rights, as of 2020, "slavery is still an issue."

Formal Networking
The Islamic Center Charity Society in Jordan is an example of one way middle class Jordanian women are able to network and connect over mutual experiences. Instead of functioning like a traditional “charity,” these Islamic charity institutions are founded on a more social basis. While these they are not officially connected to the state, they impact the country both socially and politically.

Other community groups in Jordan, like the Jordanian Hashemite Fund, encourage women to form their own committees, run for local elections, and form small female-only cooperatives. When many of these initiatives began in the 1980s, they received marked opposition from community leaders, with some threatening to shut down women's committees in their area.

In the arts, the Jordanian Female Artist Collective, launched in 2020 by music sector entrepreneur Mais Sahli, is among the organizations working to promote Jordanian women in creative industries.

Family rights

Marriage
Jordanian husbands determine their wives’ abilities to employ their constitutionally guaranteed rights to work and other public activities. Jordanian legislation and culture suggests that men have a certain control over their wives to mediate their interaction with the public. Men expect their wives to be obedient because they work in order to support the family financially. Some amendments postpone this “ownership” for young girls. For example, the Jordanian Parliament increased the legal age of marriage to 18 for both boys and girls, as the previous law set the legal age for marriage at 16 for boys and 15 for girls, which promoted early marriages and subsequent school drop out for married girls.

Divorce
Divorce law is based almost entirely on Islamic Shari'a law, which is considered "unquestionable authority." Variations in interpretation and application, however, do exist among Islamic courts across the Middle East. Divorces in Jordan, in particular, often ignore women's rights and leave women with nothing if they are not supported by their families. In recent years, the government has worked to fix this problem by altering the judicial system. For example, "a new law has been drafted to force men to pay alimony for three years instead of six months, which was previously the case.” Because men are free to divorce and stop supporting their wives if they are "disobedient," another law created an obligatory fund for divorced women, guaranteeing them a settlement from their ex-husband.

Children
The father was technically responsible for the children's property, maintenance and education while the mother was responsible for the "physical care and nurturing" of the children. While the father was considered the "natural guardian", if the parents were divorced the mother would take custody. Today, however, children "belong" to both parents but the mother generally stays home to raise the children.

Property
While studies of women and their property rights evidence that Islamic courts have "upheld women's rights to property," women in Jordan legally own and inherit less than their male relatives do. Throughout history and still today, when women have owned and inherited property, they have been frequently and intensely pressured to give up their land to male family members. As a result, less than four percent of all property in Jordan is owned by women.

Gender-Based Violence

Honor killings
Honor crimes are acts of violence committed by family members against women who are perceived to have shamed the family in some way. Women can "shame" their family by engaging in "marital infidelity, pre-marital sex and flirting", or getting raped  The Jordanian Penal Code today still includes provisions that excuse honor crimes by granting the perpetrator leniency in punishment. Many of these killings go unreported, but each year tens of women are killed by family members in order to "restore honor." Honor killings occur across the Middle East and around the world. The United Nations Commission on Human Rights reports of honor killings in Bangladesh, Great Britain, Brazil, Ecuador, Egypt, India, Israel, Italy, Jordan, Pakistan, Morocco, Sweden, Turkey, and Uganda expose that this practice "goes across cultures and across religions."

It has been difficult to change legislation (particularly Article 340 of the Jordanian Penal Code) because violence against women has traditionally been considered a "private matter" rather than the "responsibility of the state." In fact, there has been a nationwide women's human rights campaign, supported by King Abullah and Queen Rania, to modify Article 340, which grants perpetrators of honor killings leniency in Jordanian courts.

In April 2010, a 33-year-old man was charged with "hammering his wife to death and dumping her body on the highway leading to the Queen Alia International Airport". The husband easily confessed to murdering his wife in order to defend his honor, as she had been out meeting a male friend without his permission. "There are about 12 honor crime cases every year in Jordan," said Diana Shalabi, director of the complaint office at the Jordanian National Commission for Women. "However," she said, "many crimes involving women are seen as honor killings and should be called regular crimes instead."

Annually, Jordan reports between 15 to 20 honor killings, according to the Human Rights Watch.

"The Marriage Rape Law" 

Previously, Article 308 of the Jordanian Penal Code stipulated that perpetrators of particular crimes, including rape, could "avoid severe criminal sentencing if they married the targets of their sexual abuse," thus, among activists invested in the abolishment of the law, the article came to be known as the “ marriage rape law.”  The law was struck down in August 2017, which was lauded as a public victory for women's organizations. A similar law was struck down in Tunisia during that same summer, and thus the change in Jordan's code can also be seen as a part of a global campaign, in addition to its crediting as the fruits of local organizing.

See also 
Women in Islam
Women in Arab societies
Women's rights
LGBTQ rights in Jordan
Islamophobia

References

External links

 
Jordanian culture
Jordan